Love Goes On is the debut solo studio album by American country music singer Paulette Carlson, who until 1991 was the lead singer of the band Highway 101. Her first solo album, it produced the singles "I'll Start with You" and "Not with My Heart You Don't," which respectively reached numbers 21 and 68 on the Hot Country Songs charts. A third single, "The Chain Just Broke," failed to chart.

Critical reception
Michael McCall of Allmusic rated the album four stars out of five, saying that she showed a similar musical personality to her work in Highway 101, but adding that the production was too slick. Alanna Nash of Entertainment Weekly gave the album a "C", saying that "Without a spirited band behind her[…]Carlson and her hyper-quavering soprano seem oddly detached from the material, which, with the exception of the bluesy The Chain Just Broke, seems merely bland and undistinguished country-pop."

Track listing

Personnel
 Paulette Carlson - Lead Vocals
 Bill Cuomo - Synthesizer, Piano
 Paul Franklin - Pedabro, Steel Guitar
 Sonny Garrish - Steel Guitar
 Vicki Hampton - Background Vocals
 John Barlow Jarvis - Piano
 Mike Lawler - Synthesizer
 Tom Roady - Percussion
 Chris Rodriguez - Background Vocals
 Leland Sklar - Bass guitar
 Harry Stinson - Background Vocals
 Carlos Vega - Drums
 Billy Joe Walker, Jr. - Acoustic Guitar
 Reggie Young - Electric Guitar

References

Paulette Carlson albums
1991 debut albums
Albums produced by Jimmy Bowen
Capitol Records albums